The Baghdad–Basra rail line is a railway line that operates since 2014 between the cities of Baghdad and Basra in Iraq. There is one train service per day, taking 10–12 hours, in each direction. Both are at night. The trains are new, and made in China.

The line was first announced by Thierry Mariani, a French junior transport minister, at the 2011 Paris Air Show on 24 June 2011. He said that French company Alstom and the Iraqi government had signed a memorandum of understanding (MOU) regarding a contract to build the proposed line. Alstom will conduct exclusive talks with the Iraqi government for a year. During the announcement of the deal, Mariani also said that he planned to travel to Iraq to discuss the project later in the year. According to an Alstom spokesperson, the company planned to seek a contract that would cover the design, construction and operation of the line.

References 

Rail transport in Iraq
Alstom